Pichilemu TV is a Chilean TV channel with its headquarters located in Pichilemu, O'Higgins Region.

The channel was created in 2000, and its current director is Yovanny Moraga. The channel's owner is the Agrupación de Audiovisualistas de Pichilemu, a non-profit organization.

The channel, along with Señal 3 La Victoria, helped with the creation of Mapuche TV, the first Mapudungun-speaking television channel in Chile, with headquarters in Panguipulli.

References

External links
 Pichilemu TV 

Mass media in Pichilemu
Television channels and stations established in 2000
Television stations in Chile
2000 establishments in Chile
Organizations based in Pichilemu